The Palacio de los Vivero is located in Valladolid, in Castile and León, Spain in front of the Convent of Las Descalzas Reales. The Catholic Monarchs married there in 1469; from the 16th century, the Crown established in the palace the seat of the Real Audiencia y Chancillería de Valladolid.

See also
Real Audiencia y Chancillería de Valladolid

Palaces in Valladolid